Bénonces is a commune in the Ain department in eastern France.

Geography

Climate
Bénonces has a oceanic climate (Köppen climate classification Cfb) closely bordering on a humid continental climate (Dfb).

Population

See also
Communes of the Ain department

References

Communes of Ain
Ain communes articles needing translation from French Wikipedia